Savoir faire may refer to:

 Savoir-faire, a French phrase used by English speakers
 Savoir-Faire, interactive fiction by Emily Short
 Savoir Faire (barge), a European cargo vessel built in 1924 and converted into a hotel barge in 1976
 Savoir-faire Linux, a Canadian open source company
 Savoir-Faire, a character from Klondike Kat
 "Savoir Faire", a song by Chic from the 1978 album C'est Chic
 "Savoir Faire", a song by Suede from the 1999 album Head Music
 "Extra Savoir-Faire" a song by They Might Be Giants from their 1994 release John Henry (album)

See also
 Heloise and the Savoir Faire, an American band